Thomas King Lyon (17 March 1915 – 26 November 1998) was a Scottish footballer who played in the Scottish League for Albion Rovers and Airdrieonians and in the English Football League for Blackpool, Chesterfield and New Brighton. An inside forward, he was on the books of Motherwell without playing for their first team, played junior football for Clydebank Juniors and Yoker Athletic, and played non-league football in England for Prescot Cables.

Life and career

Lyon was born in 1915 in Clydebank, which was then in Dunbartonshire. He played football for his school, Clydebank High School, and appeared for Clydebank Juniors in 1933 while still a schoolboy. He attracted interest from senior clubs: after trials with Rangers and Partick Thistle, he signed for Division One club Motherwell. He played for Motherwell's "A" team in the Scottish Alliance, but not for the first team. At the end of the 1933–34 season, he successfully applied for reinstatement as a junior, and signed for Yoker Athletic.

Lyon's stay in the junior ranks was brief: he signed for Division One Albion Rovers in late September 1934, and went straight into the eleven to face Celtic. He scored 25 goals in 50 league matches between then and February 1936, when Rovers loaned him to Airdrieonians to help that club's struggle against relegation from Division One. He scored six goals from ten matches, and media speculation was that perhaps Rovers should have kept him as they slid lower in the table. The following season, Rovers themselves were on the point of relegation when they sold Lyon to Blackpool for £1200; the player did not want to leave, but agreed to do so when the club's financial problems were explained to him.

He appeared little for Blackpool, and moved on to Chesterfield in 1938; he was that club's top scorer in the 1938–39 season. When competitive football was abandoned on the outbreak of war, Lyon returned to Scotland. He made a few appearances for Celtic (alongside his brother Willie who was a regular in the side) in the Scottish regional league before suffering a groin injury and returning to Chesterfield. He served in the Army during the war, and when the Football League resumed, remained with the club for two seasons before joining New Brighton for one season and then moving into non-league football with Prescot Cables.

Lyon died in Old Kilpatrick, West Dunbartonshire, in 1998 at the age of 83.

References

1915 births
1998 deaths
Sportspeople from Clydebank
Footballers from West Dunbartonshire
People educated at Clydebank High School
Scottish footballers
Association football forwards
Clydebank Juniors F.C. players
Motherwell F.C. players
Yoker Athletic F.C. players
Albion Rovers F.C. players
Airdrieonians F.C. (1878) players
Blackpool F.C. players
Chesterfield F.C. players
New Brighton A.F.C. players
Prescot Cables F.C. players
Scottish Junior Football Association players
Scottish Football League players
English Football League players
Celtic F.C. wartime guest players
British Army personnel of World War II